State Times is an Indian English language daily newspaper from the Indian state of Jammu & Kashmir. The publication is owned and operated by State Times Group, J&K.  The newspaper is widely read in the northern states of India and has also included Delhi edition in its repertoire. It claims on its website that in 2007 it was decorated with J&K Government's Best Media Award.

Editions

Broadsheet Edition 

Jammu & Kashmir and Delhi

Online edition 

State Times also publishes an online edition  catering to the needs of people spending most of their time on digital media providing real time news updates via e-paper.

Sections 
 General News
 Editorial
 District News
 Business News
 National News
 News from J&K
 International News
 Sports News

See also 
 Communications in India
 List of newspapers in India
 Media of India
 History of Kashmir

References

External links 
 

Daily newspapers published in India
Mass media in Jammu and Kashmir
Publications established in 1996
1996 establishments in Jammu and Kashmir
Jammu (city)